Harta (or ) is a village in Bács-Kiskun county, Hungary.

Demography
 Magyars
 Germans

References

External links

  in Hungarian
  Harta a Vendégvárón
  HartaPortal - hírek Hartáról

Populated places in Bács-Kiskun County
Hungarian German communities